Straszów  is a village in the administrative district of Gmina Rozprza, within Piotrków County, Łódź Voivodeship, in central Poland.

The population of the village is 305. In  1975-1998 the village was located in the Kielce Province.  Straszów is located in the Konecko-Łopuszniański Area of Protected Landscape.

References

Villages in Piotrków County